The Ferry Street Bridge is a bridge that spans the Willamette River in Eugene, Oregon, United States.  It is located near downtown Eugene, where the city's founder Eugene Skinner once operated a ferry service.  The bridge is at Willamette river mile 182.2, and is a block west of the north terminus of the actual Ferry Street.  The neighborhood immediately north of the Willamette River near the bridge is often called the "Ferry Street Bridge area."

Ferry Street Bridge carries Coburg Road in four lanes which connects the small city of Coburg to central Eugene.

The bridge is on the shortest motor vehicle route between the University of Oregon main campus and Autzen Stadium.

References

External links 
Aerial map of Ferry Street Bridge
Images of Ferry Street Bridge from the University of Oregon Library digital collections

Buildings and structures in Eugene, Oregon
Transportation in Eugene, Oregon
Bridges over the Willamette River
Bridges in Lane County, Oregon
Road bridges in Oregon
1950 establishments in Oregon
Metal bridges in the United States
Truss bridges in the United States